The Viotti International Music Competition, named after the Italian composer and violinist Gian (Giovanni) Battista Viotti (1755–1824), is held every year in Vercelli, Piedmont. It was founded by violinist Joseph Robbone in 1950 and has been, since 1957, a member of the World Federation of International Music Competitions.

The competition is dedicated primarily to piano and opera singing, with rotating categories of voice (even numbered years), piano (odd numbered years), but also features sections for violin, chamber music, oboe, guitar, dance and composition, among others.

In the fifty years since its inception, thousands of competitors have taken part, many of whom have reached international fame. They include Luigi Alva, Claudio Abbado, Cathal Breslin, Luciano Pavarotti, Mirella Freni, Nicola Martinucci, Salvatore Accardo, Joaquín Achúcarro, Daniel Barenboim, Renato Bruson, Piero Cappuccilli,  Raina Kabaivanska, Sumi Jo, Yeol Eum Son, Jeanne You, Violetta Egorova.

The judges have included Franco Corelli, Carlo Maria Giulini, Klaus Hellwig, Yehudi Menuhin, Arturo Benedetti Michelangeli, Birgit Nilsson, Carl Orff, Aureliano Pertile, Elisabeth Schwarzkopf, Renata Scotto, Joan Sutherland, and Richard Aaker Trythall, Raina Kabaivanska.

Piano Winners

1950s

1950
1:  Jean Micault
2:  Maria Teresa Garatti;  Carlos Rivero Morales
3:  Licia Mancini

1951
1:  Isabella Salamon
2:  [Hans] Peter Wallfisch
3:  Pieralberto Biondi

1952
1:  René Pouget
2:  Walter Blankenheim
3:  Alexander Jenner;  Andrzej Wasowski

1953
1:  Joaquín Achúcarro;  Luciano Bertolini;  Gabriel Tacchino
2:  Monte Hill Davis;  Eléonore Kraemer
3:  Adriana Brugnolini [Vecchiato];  Jack Edwin Guerry

1954
1:  Yoko Kono
2:  Cécile Ousset;  Chiaralberta Pastorelli;  Kurt Bauer;  Richard Cass
3:  Claudine Durussel;  Marion Zarzeczna;  Bruno Fabius; Alberto Neuman (Argentina); Emanuele Perrotta (Italy)
Grand Prix:  Daniel Barenboim

1955
1:  Cécile Ousset
2:  Alberto Colombo
3:  Danièle Dechenne–Decroos;  Günter Ludwig;  Natascia Calza;  Pierre Delgrange;  Alain Barnheim
Finalist:  Claudio Abbado

1956
1:  Robert Alexander Bohnke
2:  Pier Narciso Masi;  James Mathis
3: —

1957
1: —
2:  Claude Conard-Dargier;  George Katz
3:  Andrée Darras

1958
1: —
2:  Ivan Roy Davis Jr.;  Claude Berard
3: —

1959
1: —
2:  John Perry;  Irène Pamboukjian;  Annick Savornin-Daru
3:  Gino Brandi;  Vittorio Del Col;  Pierre-Yves Le Roux;  Luisa De Robertis;  Raffaella D’Esposito

1960s

1960
1:  Dale Bartlett
2:  Eugenia Hymann Monacelli;  Midori Miura
3:  Bruno Pompili;  Jerzy Gajek

1961
1:  Alberto Neuman
2:  Giorgio Sacchetti
3:  Antonio Rodríguez Baciero;  Luigi Galvani

1962
1: —
2 (Grand Prix):  Lidia Rocchetti;  Christian Bernard
2:  Minka Royer-Routcheva;  Giuliano Silveri;  Alessandro Specchi
3: —

1963
1:  Franco Angeleri;  Gernot Kahl
2:  Paule-Françoise Bonnet;  Gi-In Wang –  Dag Achatz; –  Ivan Darel-Kaiserman;  Marco Vavolo
3: —

1964
1:  François-Joël Thiollier
2:  Rafael Orozco-Flores;  Lois-Carole Pachucki
3:  Claude Savard

1965
1:  Joaquín Ángel Soriano Villanueva
2:  Yoshiya Iwamoto;  Robert Spillman (US);  [Norma] Raquel Boldorini;  Leonora Milá i Romeu;  Suzanne Husson
3:  Fausto Di Cesare;  Vladimir Krpan

1966
1:  Jesús González Alonso;  Klaus Hellwig
2:  Ettore Peretti
3:  Riccardo Risaliti;  Kaori Kimura

1967
1:  Jacques Rouvier
2:  Ettore Peretti;  Catherine Collard
3:  Jivko Paunov;  Marie-Cécile Milan;  Supitra Riensuvarn
Finalist:  Jean-Louis Steuerman

1968
1:  Alexandra Ablewicz;  Anna Maria Cigoli
2:  Micaela Mingardo
3:  Danielle De Gasquet;  César Brunin Zaror;  Franz-Friedrich Eichberger

1969
1:  Sergio Marengoni
2:  Maryvonne Le Gallo [De Saint-Pulgent];  César Brunin Zaror
3:  Herbert Seidel;  Marika Noda

1970s

1970
1:  Michael Krist
2:  Yong-Hi Moon;  Marina Horak
3:  Carlos Cebro;  Takejiro Hirai

1971
1:  Vincenzo Balzani;  Hiroshi Tajika
2:  Noemi Gobbi;  Yaeko Sasaki;  Vera Drencova
3: —

1972
1:  Dirk Joeres
2:  Olivier Gardon;  Bianca Bodalia
3:  Claus-Christian Schuster;  Ramzi Yassa –  Taeko Kojima

1973
1: —
2:  Pascal Devoyon; –  Csilla Schulter;  Marioara Trifan
3:  Emanuela Bellio;  Nancy Loo

1974
1: —
2:  Anne Perchat;  Pierre Laurent Aimard
3:  Johannes Kropfitsch;  Harumi Hanafusa

1975
1:  Arnulf Von Arnim;  Edson Lopes Elias
2:  Boris Bloch;  Richard Fields;  Elena Mouzalas
3:  Jacques Gauthier;  Tomoko Mizuno [Harada];  Diana K. Weekes

1976
1:  Karina Oganjan
2:  Alexandre Malkus
3:  Wolfram Lorenz;  Svetlana Potanina

1977
1:  Erik Berchot;  Ewa Pobłocka
2:  Massimo Gon; Anne Robert [-Cambresy]
3:  Elvina Zeynalova

1978
1:  Pavel Gililov;  Angela Hewitt
2:  Giovanni Umberto Battel;  Yovcho Margaritov Krushev (Bulgaria);  Jean-Yves Thibaudet
3:

1979
1: —
2:  Liora Ziv-Li;  Alain Jacquon
3: —

1980s

1980
1:  Gulzhamilija Kadyrbekova
2:  Vasif Hasanov;  Claudius Tanski
3:  François Chouchan;  Atsuko Isozaki

1981
1:  Babette Hierholzer
2:  Rita Kinka
3:  Mayo Yoshimura

1982
1: —
2:  Thomas Duis
3:  Anne Fawaz

1983
1:  Mari Tsuda
2: —
3:  Olivier Cazal;  Marie-Noëlle Damien

1984
1:  Oleg Volkov
2:  Pavel Zarukin
3: —

1985
1:  Mi-Joo Lee
2:  Véronique Pellissero;  Elisabeth Schlader
3:  Nobuyuki Nagaoka

1986
1:  Eckart Heiligers
2:  Peter Máté
3:  Martin Zehn

1987
1: —
2:  Mats Jansson
3:  Hie-Yon Choi

1988
1:  Ulrike Payer
2:  Luca Rasca
3:  Hisako Nagayoshi;  Sylviane Pintarelly [Calcagno]

1989
1:  Igor Kamenz
2:  Sergej Yerokhin
3:  Giampaolo Stuani;  Roberto Corlianò

1990s

1990
1: —
2:  Choi Kyoung-Ah (Korea);  Violetta Egorova
3: —

1991
1:  Andreij Sikhorskij
2:  Luca Ballerini
3:  Gabriele Maria Vianello;  Sergeij Milchten

1992
1:  Camillo Radicke (Germany)
2:  Wojciech Kocyan (Poland)
3:  Maria Clementi (Italy)

1993
1:  Vadim Rudenko
2:  Valeriu Rogacev
3:  Mutsuko Yamamoto

1994
1: —
2:  Valeriu Rogacev
3:  Cristiano Burato;  Francesco Cipolletta

1995
1: —
2:  Aleksandar Serdar
3:  Cristiano Burato;  Etsuko Hirose

1996
1:  Eung-Joo Chung
2:  Olga Pušečnikova [Olga Kern]
3:  Tamara Stefanovich;  Seiko Ohtomo

1997
1: —
2:  Christian Leotta
3:  Julia Bartha;  Nobuhito Nakai

1998
1: —
2:  Paolo Wolfango Cremonte;  Noriko Ishiguro
3:  Miwako Takeda

1999
1:  Ayako Kimura
2:  Alessandra Maria Ammara
3:  Davide Franceschetti

2000s

2000
1: —
2:  Davide Cabassi;  Jacob Leuschner
3:  Dong Min Lim;  Ji Yeoun You [Jeanne You]

2001
1:  Hisako Kawamura
2:  Stefania Cafaro
3:  Federico Gianello

2002
1:  Yeol-Eum Son
2:  Ekaterina Mechetina
3:  Lorenzo Di Bella

2003
1:  Hyo-Sun Lim
2:  Akiko Nikami
3:  Jun Nakao

2004
1:  Feodor Amirov
2: —
3: —

2005
1:  Mizuka Kano [Hartmann] 
2:  Yuko Mine [Ellinger]
3:  Boris Feiner

2007
1:  Martina Filjak
2:  Sergej Artsibashev
3:  Cathal Breslin

2009
1: —
2:  Stefan Ciric
3:  Christian Chamorel

2010s

2011
1:  Alexey Lebedev
2:  Illiya Zuyko
3:  Artem Yasynskyy

2013
1:  Jonathan Fournel
2: —
3:  Alexey Sychev;  Alexander Panfilov

2015
1:  Ilya Maximov
2:  Maxim Kinasov
3:  Alexander Bernstein

2017
1:  Konstantin Emelyanov
2:  Shiori Kuwahara;  Aristo Sham

2019
1:  Ziyu Liu
2:  Hans H. Suh
3:  Yilan Zhao

References

External links
 Official Website

Music competitions in Italy
Piano competitions